Voronezh Massif (also Voronezh Anteclise , or Voronezh Uplift) is a tectonic anteclise in the south of the Central Russian Upland with a high occurrence of the Precambrian basement. It lies to the southwest of the town of Voronezh, Russia.

The massif covers the southwest area of European Russia. Ukraine lies to the southwest, while Belarus is to the west. The massif is bordered northwest of the Orsha depression and Zhlobin saddle, south-west and south of the Pripyat-Donetsk aulacogens, east of the Caspian Basin, and northeast of the Moscow Basin.

The north-eastern and eastern slopes are gently sloping, while the southern slope is steeper.

in the east, the platform is covered by sedimentary rocks of the Riphean and Vendian periods. The southern portion consists of Devonian, Permian and Triassic cover, with some other Mesozoic and Cenozoic rocks. The Voronezh anteclise formed mainly in the Hercynian orogeny. The Voronezh anteclise contains iron ore of the Kursk Magnetic Anomaly.

See also
Geology of Russia
East European Craton

References

Geology of European Russia